Stefano Pescosolido won the title, defeating Brad Gilbert 6–0, 1–6, 6–4 in the final.

Seeds

  Emilio Sánchez (quarterfinals)
  Andre Agassi (second round)
  Derrick Rostagno (first round)
  Alberto Mancini (quarterfinals)
  MaliVai Washington (semifinals)
  Javier Sánchez (first round)
  Brad Gilbert (final)
  Andrei Chesnokov (semifinals)

Draw

Finals

Top half

Bottom half

External links
 Singles draw

Singles